Rogério Simonetti Marinho (born 26 November 1963) is a Brazilian economist and politician, member of the Liberal Party (PL). He's currently a senator representing Rio Grande do Norte since 2023. He was a Federal Deputy until 1 February 2019, representing the state of Rio Grande do Norte, and was the President of Honor of the Brazilian Social Democracy Party (PSDB) in his state. 

Marinho was also the State Secretary of Economic Development of Rio Grande do Norte during the government of Rosalba Ciarlini and was the Minister of Regional Development from 2020 to 2022 during Jair Bolsonaro's government.

References

External links
 
 
 Page in the website of the Chamber of Deputies (in Portuguese)

|-

1963 births
Living people
People from Natal, Rio Grande do Norte
Brazilian Social Democracy Party politicians
Government ministers of Brazil
Members of the Chamber of Deputies (Brazil) from Rio Grande do Norte